Portrait of Thomas Cromwell is a small oil painting by the German and Swiss artist Hans Holbein the Younger, usually dated to between 1532 and 1534, when Cromwell, an English lawyer and statesman who served as chief minister to King Henry VIII of England from 1532 to 1540, was around 48 years old. It is one of two portraits Holbein painted of him; the other is a tondo from a series of medallions of Tudor courtiers.

The original panel is lost, and today known from three copies: in the Frick Collection in New York (where it is hung opposite Holbein's Portrait of Thomas More); in the National Portrait Gallery in London and the Chichester Constable collection in Yorkshire. The Frick panel is considered superior in quality.

Subject

Thomas Cromwell was a lawyer and statesman who began as a blacksmith's son in Putney, and rose to power as an associate of Cardinal Wolsey. After Wolsey's fall and a period of initial distrust, he became a confidant of Henry VIII, assuming the roles of vicegerent, Lord Chancellor, lord high chamberlain, amongst others. A shrewd politician, he was aware of the effect of propaganda and commissioned Holbein to produce images positioning him as a reformist and royalist, including anti-clerical woodcuts and the title page for Myles Coverdale's English translation of the bible. In this he was both progressive and attuned to Henry VIII's grandiose programme of artistic patronage. The king's efforts to glorify his own status as Supreme Head of the Church culminated in the building of Nonsuch Palace, started in 1538.

Cromwell engineered the king's divorce from Catherine of Aragon. He was an early ally of Anne Boleyn but played a key role in her downfall. He was a significant force in the Tudor court until, hoping to strengthen the political alliance with the Protestant cause in Germany, he erred in advising Henry to marry Anne of Cleves. The move was unpopular and afforded his many enemies the chance to bring charges of treason, forcing his eventual arrest and beheading.

This left Holbein in an uncertain position; his guile had allowed him survive the downfalls of More and Anne, but Cromwell's sudden fall badly damaged his reputation. Although he managed to retain his position as King's painter, his standing never recovered.

Description
The portrait dates from Holbein's second visit to England, when Cromwell was acting on behalf of Henry VIII and commissioned a series of propagandistic images of favoured courtiers at a time when Cromwell's reputation was at its highest. He had emerged as the "Protestant counterweight to Thomas More in the Privy council", sealed Boleyn's position in bitter circumstance, and became one of the most influential and powerful men in England. At the same time he was cultured and instrumental in promoting Holbein's career. Perhaps because of this, and given the portrait's genesis is steeped in the high and bloody politics of the time, with an unsteady king, we know nothing of Holbein's thoughts on the depiction.

Cromwell is given due respect, but is presented as sour and somewhat stiff. The eyes are narrowly set, he tightly grips the seal. His reputation was poor until revision in the 1960s; today he is seen as a reformer and a highly capable, supreme political operator. Reflecting earlier opinion, it was noted that "of all the portraits that Holbein did at the English court, the portrait of Cromwell has always seemed the least flattering to its subject, the most viciously mocking." Mindful of the protracted, fatal relationship between Cromwell and More, and their placing at the Frick, Henry Clay romantically asked that we "imagine Thomas More, the beautiful saint, and Cromwell, the monster, united in art and history, now facing each other, [through] Holbein and time and chance."

Compared to Holbein's other portraits of Tudor politicians, Cromwell seems reduced; he is placed low in the frame, deep in the pictorial space, placing a distance and diminishing him from the viewer. The table reaches into the immediate foreground as if reaching into the viewer's personal space. Holbein presents Cromwell as somewhat sour, cold and grim, yet the portrait has been described as "a softened version of the subject". Historian R. B. Merriman described Cromwell as "a short, stoutly built man, with a large face, smooth shaven, with close-cropped hair, and a heavy double chin, with a small and cruel mouth, an extraordinary long upper lip, and a pair of gray eyes set closely together, and moving restlessly under his light eyebrows."

The inscription on the border reads "To our trusty and right well, beloved Councillor, Thomas Cromwell, Master of our Jewel House". Cromwell sits on a bench before a table holding a legal document. His left hand has a patterned gold ring with a large green gemstone.  He is dressed in sober colours, comprising a black fur lined overcoat, a black hat and a "severe expression". The table is covered with a green cloth. Some of his effects are placed on it, including a quill, a devotional book, scissors and a leather bag. The version held by the Frick Collection in New York, is in oil on oak panel and measures .

Attribution and dating
The painting usually dated as c. 1532–4, when Cromwell was Master of the Jewel House The original portrait probably showed a painted scroll above his head, the text of the Frick version was removed during an early 20th restoration/improvement. The wording seems likely designed to position Cromwell beside the king. It read "To our trusty and right well beloved Councillor, Thomas Cromwell, Master of our Jewel House". the wording exists in a 1915 photograph of the Frick painting, but was removed. That panel underwent extensive technical analysis in 1952, and was cleaned in 1966; work that "did not substantiate an attribution to Holbein", but rather indicated the hand of a less skilled, workshop member.

Provenance
In an undated inventory from Cromwell's London home, an unknown writer mentions "2 tables of my master his (vis)namy painted". Little is known of the original after that. Only hours after Cromwell was taken to Traitors' Gate on 1 June 1540, soldiers arrived at his house to remove his belongings to the treasury, a fate that had befallen More some five years earlier. Holbein's portrait was most likely destroyed or sold soon after Cromwell's fall; there is no record of it in any later royal inventory.

The first mention of copies is in the records of the Countess of Caledon from 1866 when she lent it to National Portrait Exhibition. That version is now in the Frick collection. Art scholar Roy Strong believed that the three extant portraits are copies. They are all in poor condition but the Frick version is the best preserved. Historian John Rowlands deduced from the pentimenti (alteration) revealed by X-ray photographs that the Frick version shows the hand of Holbein and is the original. The art historian Stephanie Buck agrees with the attribution, although it is highly contentious. Strong counters that as a traitor, Cromwell's personal effects were destroyed soon after his execution.

Notes

Sources

 Beckingsale, B. W. Thomas Cromwell: Tudor Minister. London: Palgrave Macmillan, 1978. 
Cust, Lionel, "A Newly Discovered Miniature of Thomas Cromwell", The Burlington Magazine for Connoisseurs, Volume 20, No. 103, 1911
 Erickson, Peter; Hulse, Clark. "Early Modern Visual Culture: Representation, Race, and Empire in Renaissance England: Representation, Race, Empire in Renaissance England". University of Pennsylvania Press, 2000.   
 Schofield, John. The Rise & Fall of Thomas Cromwell. Stroud: The History Press, 2008. 
Smith, Goldwin, "A Gallery of Portraits". The North American Review, Volume 176, No. 557, 1903
Strong, Roy, "Holbein in England". The Burlington Magazine, Volume 109, No. 770, 1967
Wilson, Derek. Hans Holbein: Portrait of an Unknown Man. London: Pimlico, 2006.

External links
At the National Portrait Gallery
At the Frick

1530s paintings
Cromwell, Thomas
Cromwell
Paintings in the National Portrait Gallery, London
Books in art